Desus & Mero is an American television late-night talk show hosted by Desus Nice and The Kid Mero that ran from October 17, 2016, to June 28, 2018, on Viceland. In 2018, the show's hosts left Viceland and moved to Showtime and the new Desus & Mero premiered on February 21, 2019.

This is the second series co-hosted by Desus and Mero, following the 2014 Complex TV web series Desus vs. Mero.

Episodes

Season 1

Season 2

References

External links
 Desus & Mero on Viceland
 

2016 web series debuts
2016 American television series debuts
2018 American television series endings
2010s American late-night television series
Viceland original programming
2010s American television talk shows